Hannah Russell,  (born 5 August 1996) is a British Paralympic swimmer competing in S12 classification events. In 2012, she became British S12 champion in the 100m backstroke and qualified for the 2012 Summer Paralympic Games where she won a silver in the 400m freestyle and a bronze in the 100m butterfly. In the 2016 Summer Paralympic Games, she won the gold medal in the 100m backstroke with the time of 1:06:06 earning her the World Record.

Career history

Road to London 2012
Russell was born in Ottershaw, Surrey in 1992. Russell, who has a visual impairment, took up swimming at the age of five, first joining Woking Swimming Club, before then moving to Guildford City Swimming Club at the age of twelve. She was educated at Gordon's School in West End in Surrey, before switching to Kelly College in Tavistock. In 2010, she was scouted through the 'Playground to Podium' initiative, a British system of spotting sporting talent in young people with a disability. After being classified as S12 in 2011, she entered the 2011 IPC European Championships, in Berlin. There she won two medals, silver in the 100 m backstroke and bronze in the 100 m butterfly. In 2012, she took part in the 2012 British Championships, taking another two medals, taking gold in the 100 m backstroke and silver in the 400 m freestyle. During the British Championship, Russell broke the European record in the S12 class 100 m backstroke, with a time of 1:09.52. Later that month, at the Nationwide Junior and Youth Swimming Championships in Sheffield, she broke two S12 world records, in the 400 m freestyle and the 100 m backstroke.

Although stating that her sights were set on qualifying for the 2016 Summer Paralympics in Rio, Russell's results were good enough to make the Great Britain swimming team for the 2012 Games in London. At 16 years old, she was one of the youngest members of the team, and was entered into five S12 events; the 50 m freestyle, 100 m freestyle, 400 m freestyle, 100 m backstroke, and 100 m butterfly. In her first event, the 400 m freestyle she swam a personal best of 4:38.60 to take the silver, her first paralympic medal. She finished 0.71 seconds behind Oxana Savchenko of Russia. She won her second medal of the Games, a bronze, in the 100 m butterfly.

Montreal to Rio
In 2013 Russell entered her first IPC Swimming World Championships when she travelled to Montreal as part of the Great Britain team. There she won five medals, a bronze in the 400m freestyle, three silver in the 50m freestyle, 100m freestyle and 100m butterfly and became world champion in the 100m backstroke. The following year she took part in the 2014 IPC Swimming European Championships in Eindhoven. At the games she continued her rivalry with Russian Darya Stukalova which began in Montreal. Russell won six medals, all silver, apart from the 100m backstroke for which she took gold on the day of her eighteenth birthday. Just after her eighteenth birthday, she returned to Woking Swimming Club and has had dual membership of Woking Swimming Club and City of Manchester Aquatics since May 2016. Her final major international before the 2016 Paralympics was the 2015 IPC Swimming World Championships, held in Glasgow. The 2015 Championships had a narrower list of events for S12 classification swimmers, and Russell entered only three events, winning gold in the 50m freestyle and two silver medals in the 100m backstroke and 100m freestyle.

Mental health break
In 2019 Russell took a break from swimming as a result of anxiety and depression. During this time she completed a degree in sports science from the University of Salford and was inspired to return to swimming by watching the 2019 Para-swimming World Championships.

Tokyo 2020
At the Tokyo 2020 Paralympic Games Russell won the gold medal in the S12 Women's 100m Backstroke and a bronze medal in the S12 Women's 100m Freestyle, also competing in the S13 Women's 50m Freestyle.

Russell was appointed Member of the Order of the British Empire (MBE) in the 2017 New Year Honours and Officer of the Order of the British Empire (OBE) in the 2022 New Year Honours for services to swimming.

At the Commonwealth Games in Birmingham in 2022, Hannah Russell won her first Commonwealth Games medal. She took the silver medal in the Women’s 50m Freestyle S13.

References

External links
 
 

1996 births
Living people
English female swimmers
British female backstroke swimmers
British female freestyle swimmers
S12-classified Paralympic swimmers
Paralympic swimmers of Great Britain
Paralympic gold medalists for Great Britain
Paralympic silver medalists for Great Britain
Paralympic bronze medalists for Great Britain
Paralympic medalists in swimming
Swimmers at the 2012 Summer Paralympics
Swimmers at the 2016 Summer Paralympics
Swimmers at the 2020 Summer Paralympics
Medalists at the 2012 Summer Paralympics
Medalists at the 2016 Summer Paralympics
Medalists at the 2020 Summer Paralympics
Medalists at the World Para Swimming Championships
Medalists at the World Para Swimming European Championships
Swimmers at the 2022 Commonwealth Games
Commonwealth Games medallists in swimming
Commonwealth Games silver medallists for England
Sportspeople from Chertsey
People from Ottershaw
Officers of the Order of the British Empire
British female butterfly swimmers
Medallists at the 2022 Commonwealth Games